Leopoldo Salcedo (March 12, 1912 – June 11, 1998) was a Filipino film actor dubbed as "The Great Profile" who specialized in portraying dramatic heroes.

Early life
Salcedo was born in Cavite. His father was of Spanish descent whose family immigrated in the Philippines years prior. His mother was a Filipina.  In his youth, he had entered the seminary with aspirations towards priesthood, but he left after a year. Instead, he joined the bodabil troupe of Lou Borromeo in 1929. By 1934, Salcedo had broken into films, starring in José Nepomuceno's Sawing Palad. He was playing leading roles by the late 1930s, and signed up with the newly formed LVN studio. Among his most prominent roles during this period was as Macario Sakay, in Lamberto Avellana's debut film Sakay (1939).

Film production in the Philippines was halted after the Japanese invasion in 1941, and Salcedo returned to bodabil. He would perform at the Avenue Theater for the duration of the war. Salcedo also engaged in guerilla activities, for which he was incarcerated and released only upon the intercession of Benigno Aquino Sr.

Postwar stardom
After the war ended in 1945, Salcedo starred in such dramas as Capas (1946) and Siete Dolores (1948). In 1950, Salcedo formed his own production company, Leopoldo Salcedo Productions, which produced such films as Dalawang Bandila (1950), Talampasan (1953), and Highway 54 (1953). Many of Salcedo's post-war choices in roles tended towards socially relevant dramas. He had intended to produce a film on the life of the Hukbalahap leader Luis Taruc. Films such as Bisig ng Manggagawa (1951) and Batong Buhay (Sa Central Luzon) (1950) dealt with labor and agrarian strife. Years later, when he was cited by the Gawad Urian for its lifetime achievement award, his film career were characterized in this manner: [M]ore than just good looks, he was also radical with his characterizations, preferring to portray the politicized and the social outcast, the underdog and enraged sheep while his meztizo confreres chose the dusted tuxedos and the rank perfumes of the music halls. From the very start, his approach to acting has always been to emphasize “being”, to be honest to oneself, to pour one’s heart and soul into the role and to eschew the artificial as this could be magnified several times on the big screen. 

Salcedo's most famous role came in 1961, when he starred as the titular character in Gerry de Leon's The Moises Padilla Story, a film biography of a Negros Occidental mayoral candidate who in 1951, was tortured and murdered by the private army of the provincial governor after he had refused to withdraw his candidacy. For this role, Salcedo won his first FAMAS Best Actor award. He would win another FAMAS, this time as Best Supporting Actor, in 1976 for his portrayal of a zarzuela actor in Eddie Romero's Ganito Kami Noon, Paano Kayo Ngayon.

Salcedo's film career slowed down in the 1980s. His last film appearance was in Raymond Red's 1993 film Sakay, where he played the father of the same character he had portrayed 54 years earlier. He had been bedridden for one year before his death in 1998.

Filmography
Sawing Palad (1934)
Sakay (1939) - Macario Sakay
Capas (1946)
Ang Kamay ng Diyos (1947)
Siete Dolores (1948)
Dalawang Bandila (1950)
Batong Buhay (Sa Central Luzon) (1950)
Bisig ng Manggagawa (1951)
Talampasan (1953)
Highway 54 (1953)
Lost Battalion (1960) - Ramon
Noli Me Tángere (1961) - Elias
The Moises Padilla Story (1961) - Moises Padilla
Cry of Battle (1963) - Manuel Careo
Combat Killers (1968) - Gen. Kenji Takahashi
Ganito Kami Noon... Paano Kayo Ngayon? (1976) - Fortunato 'Atong' Capili
Sakay (1993) - Macario Sakay's father

Notes

References

External links

Leopoldo Salcedo's website: http://www.freewebs.com/leopoldosalcedo/

1912 births
1998 deaths
20th-century Filipino male actors
Male actors from Cavite